Commersonia apella, commonly known as many-flowered commersonia, is a small, upright shrub in the family Malvaceae and is endemic to Western Australia. It has hairy leaves and whitish flowers.

Description
The new growth stems are sessile or have short stalks, glandular, yellowish, and covered with star-shaped hairs. The pedicel and peduncle are both thickly covered with sessile, yellow or white star-shaped hairs.

Taxonomy and naming
Commersonia apella was first formally described in 2011 by Carolyn F. Wilkins and the description was published in Australian Systematic Botany from specimens collected west of Denmarkk in 1978. The specific epithet (apella) means "without a bowl".

Distribution and habitat
Many-flowered commersonia grows in sandy clay in woodland, forest and coastal location between Pemberton and Esperance.

Conservation status
Commersonia apella is listed as "Threatened" by the Western Australian Government Department of Biodiversity, Conservation and Attractions, meaning that it is in danger of extinction.

References 

apella
Endemic flora of Western Australia
Rosids of Western Australia
Plants described in 2011
Taxa named by Carolyn F. Wilkins